Akiko Fukushima (born 29 June 1973) is a Japanese professional golfer who played on the LPGA Tour.

Fukushima won 24 times on the LPGA of Japan Tour.

Fukushima won twice on the LPGA Tour both in 1999.

She is the daughter of Hisaaki Fukushima, a catcher who played professional baseball in Japan for 19 seasons.

Professional wins (26)

LPGA of Japan Tour wins (24)

Tournaments in bold denotes major tournaments in LPGA of Japan Tour.

LPGA Tour wins (2)

References

External links
 

2009 U.S. Women's Open profile

Japanese female golfers
LPGA of Japan Tour golfers
LPGA Tour golfers
Sportspeople from Yokohama
1973 births
Living people